Orlando Jones (born April 10, 1968) is an American stand-up comedian and actor. He is known for being one of the original cast members of the sketch comedy series MADtv, for his role as the 7 Up spokesman from 1999 to 2002, and for his role as the African god Anansi on Starz's American Gods.

Early life
Jones was born in Mobile, Alabama, in 1968. His father was a professional baseball player in the Philadelphia Phillies organization. He moved to Mauldin, South Carolina, when he was a teen and graduated from Mauldin High School in 1985. One of his early acting experiences involved playing a werewolf in a haunted house to help raise money for the junior/senior prom. Jones enrolled in the College of Charleston, South Carolina. He left in 1990 without finishing his degree.

To pursue his interest in the entertainment industry, Jones, together with comedian Michael Fechter, formed a production company, Homeboy's Productions and Advertising. Together Jones and Fechter worked on several projects including a McDonald's commercial with basketball superstar Michael Jordan for the McDonald's specialty sandwich the "McJordan".

He scored his first Hollywood job in 1987, writing for the NBC comedy A Different World, on which he had a small guest role in the season five finale. During 1991-92, Jones penned the Fox series Roc and, in 1993, he co-produced The Sinbad Show. He also made a brief appearance on the FOX sitcom Herman's Head in 1992.

Career

MADtv
After hosting Fox's music series Sound FX, in 1994, Jones became one of the original nine cast members of MADtv. Unlike some of his fellow original repertory performers on MADtv, Jones came to the show with limited sketch comedy experience.

Throughout the first two seasons of MADtv, Jones performed as characters like the Cabana Chat band leader Dexter St. Croix and Reverend LaMont Nixon Fatback, the vocal follower of Christopher Walken. He was also noted for his impressions of Thomas Mikal Ford, Temuera Morrison, Warwick Davis, Danny DeVito, Michael Jai White, Eddie Griffin, and Ice Cube.

After two seasons on MADtv, Jones left the show to pursue a movie career. However, Jones returned to MADtv in 2004 to celebrate its 200th episode.

Other television projects
Aside from MADtv, Jones made many other television appearances. Perhaps his most popular and enduring television appearance was in a series of humorous commercials as the spokesperson for 7 Up where he gained wide recognition. Notably, one commercial had him wear a t-shirt that had 7 Up's then-slogan Make 7 Up Yours divided between the front and back with the double entendre on the back that featured the Up Yours part; 7 Up would sell the shirt through specialty retailer Spencer Gifts for many years.

This exposure led to a plethora of opportunities for Jones. First, he hosted an HBO First Look special in 2000 and then, in 2003, was given his own late night talk show on FX called The Orlando Jones Show. Although his talk show was short lived, Jones continued to make additional television appearances. In 2003, he appeared on The Bernie Mac Show and on Girlfriends. In 2006, Jones decided to return to television as one of the lead characters of ABC's crime drama The Evidence, as Cayman Bishop. He has also appeared in two episodes of Everybody Hates Chris, the first in 2007 as Chris's substitute teacher and the second in 2008 as Clint Huckstable, an allusion to the character Cliff Huxtable played by Bill Cosby on The Cosby Show.

In 2008, he appeared as Harold Wilcox, a violent veteran with PTSD, on New Amsterdam. In the first season of the show, Jones also starred on Wild 'N Out. Jones was the first guest star on the show. Jones was the co-host of ABC's Crash Course (which was canceled after 4 episodes). On November 16, 2009, it was announced on TV Guide that Jones had been cast as Marcus Foreman, Eric Foreman's brother on House, appearing in the season six episode "Moving the Chains". In 2013, he was hired as a principal actor in the FOX television series Sleepy Hollow. The freshman drama opened to FOX's highest fall drama premiere numbers since the premiere of '24' in 2001.

From 2016 through 2019, Jones portrayed Mr. Nancy, aka the African god Anansi, in the Starz series American Gods.

Film projects
After leaving MADtv, Jones expanded his cinema résumé. He appeared in a bit part in his first big screen film, In Harm's Way (1991), then joined Larry David in the feature Sour Grapes (1998), playing the character of an itinerant man. Subsequently, he appeared in Woo (1998), Mike Judge's Office Space (1999), alongside fellow MADtv alumnus David Herman, and in Barry Levinson's praised drama, Liberty Heights (1999). Since then, Jones has appeared in Magnolia (1999), New Jersey Turnpikes (1999) and in Harold Ramis' Bedazzled (2000).

During the 2000s, Jones' career began to branch out. In addition to his witty appearances in the 7-Up campaigns, Jones played the role of Clifford Franklin in The Replacements (2000) and the horror film From Dusk till Dawn 3: The Hangman's Daughter (2003). In 2002, Jones landed the lead role of Daryl Chase in the action-dramedy Double Take (2001), alongside Eddie Griffin, and worked with David Duchovny, Seann William Scott and Julianne Moore in Ivan Reitman's sci-fi comedy, Evolution (2001). Jones was also in the 2009 film Cirque du Freak: The Vampire's Assistant and he appeared as the computer Vox 114 in The Time Machine (2002). His other more recent films includes Drumline (2002), Biker Boyz (2003), Godzilla (2005), Runaway Jury (2003) and Primeval (2004).  Jones appeared in an uncredited cameo and played in Grindhouse Planet Terror (2007 film).

In 2011 Jones appeared in the documentary film Looking for Lenny, in which he talks about Lenny Bruce and freedom of speech. In 2012, Jones starred in Joe Penna's original interactive thriller series Meridian created in conjunction with Fourth Wall Studios.

Voice acting
Jones has been featured in many voice acting projects over the years. In 1993, he appeared in Yuletide in the 'hood and in 1998, he made a guest appearance in the animated comedy TV Series, King of the Hill. He then lent his voice to another TV series, Father of the Pride, as well as the video games Halo 2 (where he voiced Marine Sergeant Banks and other black marines) and L.A. Rush. In 2006, he co-created, produced and voice acted for the MTV2 animated series The Adventures of Chico and Guapo.

In early April 2013, it was largely thought that Jones would be taking Tyler Perry's place as Madea. This stemmed from Jones's own report that he would be taking over the role, and a photography of himself impersonating Madea. This led to public outcry from fans. Perry later revealed, however, that this was an elaborate prank played by Jones, stating, "That was an April Fools' joke that HE did. Not true. And not funny. When I’m done with Madea, she is done."

Personal life
Jones married former model Jacqueline Staph in 2009. They have a daughter. In March 2021 he divorced Jacqueline Staph, citing irreconcilable differences.

In October 2011, Jones provoked controversy when he joked on Twitter that someone should kill former Governor of Alaska and Vice Presidential candidate Sarah Palin. He apologized for the comment several days later.

Filmography

Film

Television

Video Games

References

External links
Official website

Biography, Filmography and Photos at Hollywood.com

1968 births
Living people
20th-century American comedians
20th-century American male actors
20th-century African-American people
21st-century American comedians
21st-century American male actors
21st-century African-American people
Actors from Mobile, Alabama
African-American male actors
American male comedians
American male film actors
American male television actors
American male voice actors
American sketch comedians
American stand-up comedians
College of Charleston alumni
Keurig Dr Pepper people
People from Mauldin, South Carolina